Jay Creek may refer to:

Jay Creek (Missouri), a stream in the U.S. state of Missouri
Jay Creek, Northern Territory, a ghost town in Australia